Dmitri Klevakin (born February 20, 1976) is a Russian former professional ice hockey player.  He played in the Russian Superleague for HC Spartak Moscow, Metallurg Novokuznetsk, Salavat Yulaev Ufa and HC MVD. He was drafted 96th overall in the 1994 NHL Entry Draft by the Tampa Bay Lightning.

Career statistics

External links

1976 births
Living people
HC CSKA Moscow players
HC Khimik Voskresensk players
Metallurg Novokuznetsk players
HC MVD players
Krylya Sovetov Moscow players
Russian ice hockey right wingers
Salavat Yulaev Ufa players
Tampa Bay Lightning draft picks
People from Angarsk
Sportspeople from Irkutsk Oblast